Firefly Lane is a historical fiction novel written by the American author Kristin Hannah published by St. Martin's Press in 2008. The story follows the friendship and bond of Tully Hart and Kate Mularkey throughout the years.

A 10-episode Netflix streaming television adaptation of the novel with the same name premiered in February, 2021.

Development
Hannah drew inspiration for the novel from her own life growing up in Seattle, Washington in the 1970s and 1980s, as well as her experiences studying at the University of Washington.

Reception
Firefly Lane spent 28 weeks on The New York Times Best Seller paperback fiction list in 2009. As of 2015, the novel has sold more than 1.2 million copies.

Publishers Weekly noted that "Hannah takes the easy way out with an over-the-top tear-jerker ending, though her upbeat message of the power of friendship and family will, for some readers, trump even the most contrived plot twists." Kirkus Reviews stated that "Dated sermonizing on career versus motherhood, and conflict driven by characters’ willed helplessness, sap this tale of poignancy."

Adaptation

In 2019, it was announced that Netflix ordered a 10-episode streaming television series adapted from the novel with Maggie Friedman serving as writer, showrunner and executive producer, along with Stephanie Germain; and Hannah as co-executive producer. It premiered on February 3, 2021, starring Katherine Heigl as Tully Hart and Sarah Chalke as Kate Mularkey.

References

2008 American novels
Fiction set in 1974
Historical novels
Novels set in the 1970s
Novels set in the 1980s
Novels set in the 2000s
St. Martin's Press books
American novels adapted into television shows
Novels about friendship